Begum Akhtar Riazuddin  also spelt Riaz-ud-din or Riaz-ud-deen (born 15 October 1928) is a Pakistani feminist activist who is also the first modern Urdu-travelogue writer. She has received many awards in recognition of her efforts.

Life and family 
Akhtar Jahan Begum was born in Calcutta on 15 October 1928  and graduated from Kinnaird College, Lahore, in 1949. She did her MA in English from Government College, Lahore, in 1951. She began her practical life with the profession of teaching. She remained a lecturer at Islamia College for Women, Lahore, from 1952 to 1965. She married Mian Riazuddin Ahmed, and came to be known as Begum Riazuddin. Their daughter, Ms. Nigar Ahmad, is the chairperson of the Aurat Foundation. Mr. Riazuddin, a senior civil servant, was the nephew of the Urdu writer, Salahuddin Ahmed. Justice Sabihuddin Ahmed and Asma Jahangir are related to Riazuddin through her husband.

Literary career
Begum Riazuddin's literary career is based on two travelogues, ‘Dhanak Par Qadam’ (1969) and ‘Sat Samundar Par’ (1963). In her travelogues, she uses unique similies and humorous allusions, along with satirical comments. She writes in an informal style. Her writings are simple as well as interesting. Her travelogues feature human mentality, along with civilisation and society.

Feminist activism
Riazuddin is an activist, focusing on women's uplift. She founded her welfare organisation, Behbud Association of Pakistan, for the purpose, in 1967 other branches later expanded to Lahore and in Karachi by the name of Behbud Association Karachi. . She worked as federal secretary of the Ministry of Women's Development in the late 1980s. She has attended many international conferences for the betterment and welfare of women, including the 32nd Session of the UN Commission on the Status of Women held in Vienna in March 1988.

When Benazir Bhutto became the prime minister in 1988, Riazuddin was optimistic and hoped for a better future for women after the harsh Zia regime. She said:

Other occupations
Other than being a teacher, she remained a member of the All Pakistan Music Conference Committee from 1957 to 1965. She also participated in the First All Pakistan Handicrafts Exhibition in Lahore in 1965. Begum Riazuddin also acted as adviser to the National Craft Council during mid-1980s. She is one of the founding members of Behbud Association, a social welfare organization working towards empowering women in underprivileged areas. She is a member of the board of governors of the Bait-ul-Mal, to which she was nominated by the Prime Minister of Pakistan.

Books
Her book Pakistan was published by Stacey International, London, in 1975. Another book A History of Crafts in India and Pakistan was launched in Pakistan in 1990 and the next year in London. She has also worked on a thesis titled The Contribution of Islamic Civilisation to India & Pakistan. Her works also include her travelogues, Sat Samundar Par and Dhanak Par Qadam (1969).

Awards
Riazuddin was conferred the Sitara-e-Imtiaz by the president of Pakistan in March 2000 for her voluntary social service. She received the 'Lifetime Achievement Award' of the Ministry of Women's Development in August 2005. She was also one of the group of 1,000 women nominated for the Nobel Peace Prize in 2005 as part of the 1000 PeaceWomen project.

See also

Asma Jahangir
Malala Yousafzai
Qurratulain Hyder
Urdu literature

Notes

References

1928 births
Living people
Pakistani women activists
Pakistani feminists
Muslim writers
Pakistani women's rights activists
Pakistani Muslims
Pakistani people of Bengali descent
Recipients of Sitara-i-Imtiaz
Kinnaird College for Women University alumni
Government College University, Lahore alumni
Pakistani travel writers
People from Lahore
Recipients of the Adamjee Literary Award
Urdu-language travel writers
20th-century Bengalis
21st-century Bengalis
Writers from Kolkata